This is a list of reeves and mayors of Penticton, British Columbia.

Reeves 

Alfred Wade, 1909
Edwin Foley-Bennett, 1910-11
Ivan Stevens, 1912
Edwin Foley-Bennett, 1913
Robert Scott Conklin, 1914-1916
William Alexander McKenzie, 1917
Frederick Maurice Smith, 1918-1919
Edward John Chambers, 1920-1923
James Kirkpatrick, 1924-1925
George MacDonald, 1926-1927
James Kirkpatrick, 1928
George MacDonald, 1929-1931
Charles Oliver, 1931-1935
H. B. Morley, 1936
Gordon Wilkins, 1937-1940
Robert McDougall, 1941-1942
Robert Lyon, 1943-1944
Robert McDougall, 1945
Robert Lyon, 1946-1947

Mayors 

Robert Lyon, 1948-1949
William Rathbun, 1950-1953
Oscar Matson, 1954-1957
Charles E. Oliver, 1957-1961
Maurice Finnerty, 1962-1967
F.D. Stuart, 1968-1971
Frank Laird, 1972-1975
Al Kenyon, 1976-1979
Joe Winkelaar, 1979-1980
Ivan Messmer, 1980-1986
Dorothy Whittaker, 1986-1990
Jake Kimberley, 1990-1996
Beth Campbell, 1996-1999
Mike Pearce, 1999-2002
David Perry, 2002-2005
Jake Kimberley, 2005-2008
Dan Ashton, 2008-2013
Garry Litke, 2013-2014
Andrew Jakubeit, 2014-2018
John Vassilaki, 2018-2022
Julius Bloomfield, 2022-present

Penticton

Okanagan-related lists